The 2016 Dalian Transcendence F.C. season is the club's 3rd season, and the 1st season to compete in China League One.

Background
After promoted from League Two, the team claimed that their goal in the new season was to balance their cost, and to prevent from relegation. Liu Zhongchang stayed as the manager, but resigned after just a few matches due to a claimed"physical issue". They signed Ermin Siljak, former Dalian Wanda F.C. player, as their manager, and later sacked him to replace again with his assistant manager, Rusmir Cviko.

Kits

China League One

League table

Results summary

Position by round

League fixtures and results

Chinese FA Cup

FA Cup fixtures and results

Player information

Transfers

In

Out

Squad

References

Dalian Transcendence F.C.
Dalian Transcendence F.C. seasons